601 To The 615 is a mixtape by rappers Young Buck & Boo Rossini hosted by DJ D.A. and Bigga Rankin. The mixtape features exclusive tracks and freestyles from Boo Rossini & Young Buck. Guest appearances include Young Jeezy, Slick Pulla, Young Breed, Yo Gotti, Lil Wayne and more.

Track list 
From Datpiff.

References

2010 mixtape albums
Young Buck albums